In monetary policy of the United States, the term Fedspeak (also known as Greenspeak) is what Alan Blinder called "a turgid dialect of English" used by Federal Reserve Board chairmen in making wordy, vague, and ambiguous statements. The strategy, which was used most prominently by Alan Greenspan, was used to prevent financial markets from overreacting to the chairman's remarks. The coinage is an intentional parallel to Newspeak.

Fedspeak when used by Alan Greenspan is often called Greenspeak.  An alternative definition of Greenspeak is "the coded and careful language employed by U.S. Federal Reserve Board Chairman Alan Greenspan."

Edwin le Heron and Emmanuel Carre state that "Nowadays, 'Fedspeak' (Bernanke, 2004) means clear and extensive communication of the Fed's action." Chairman Ben Bernanke and Chairwoman Yellen have effected a major change in Fed communication policy departing from the obfuscation that characterized the previous three decades. In 2014 a new detailed level of Fed communication was dubbed Fedspeak 3.0. In 2018, Chairman Jerome Powell would begin press conferences with a summary statement in plain English, in contrast to his predecessors who would read lengthy prepared statements loaded with monetary policy jargon.

In 2021, Powell used a recursive syntax in saying that "you can think of this meeting that we had as the ‘talking about talking about’ meeting."  He added, "I now suggest that we retire that term."

Origin
The notion of fed speak originated from the fact that financial markets placed a heavy value on the statements made by Federal Reserve governors, which could in turn lead to a self-fulfilling prophecy. To prevent this, the governors developed a language, termed Fedspeak, in which ambiguous and cautious statements were made to purposefully obscure and detract meaning from the statement.

Though previous "Fed" chairmen Arthur Burns and Paul Volcker were known for blowing smoke, both literally and figuratively, when appearing before Congress, Alan Greenspan is credited with making Fedspeak a "high-art". It is unclear whether the term Fedspeak was used widely prior to Greenspan, but with historical hindsight the modern term could be used to describe Burns's and Volcker's method.

Usage by Alan Greenspan

Although it was originally believed by some that Alan Greenspan, who is generally credited for popularizing Fedspeak, may have used such language unintentionally, he revealed in his 2007 book The Age of Turbulence,  that the method of avoiding the issues directly when a clear message was not desired was indeed intentional. Greenspan states that the confusion, which often resulted in conflicting interpretations, was used to prevent unintended jolts to the markets as confusing statements were typically ignored.

He noted that he came upon the dialect while at the Fed: "What I've learned at the Federal Reserve is a new language which is called 'Fed-speak'. You soon learn to mumble with great incoherence."

In an interview with 60 Minutess Lesley Stahl on September 16, 2007, Stahl stated how "In public, Greenspan was inscrutable whenever congress asked about interest rates. He resorted to an indecipherable delphic dialect known as fedspeak" to which Greenspan responded that "I would engage in some form of syntax destruction which sounded as though I were answering the question, but in fact, had not." When Stahl noted that Greenspan's responses were "impenetrably profound" and that this resulted in "two newspapers getting opposing headlines coming out of the same hearing", Greenspan responded that "I succeeded".

In an interview with CNBC's Maria Bartiromo on September 17, 2007, when asked to describe Fedspeak, Greenspan described it as:

In an interview with BusinessWeek in August 2012, when asked "about practicing the art of constructive ambiguity", Greenspan replied:

Examples of Greenspeak

, the Federal Reserve Bank of Dallas website still maintains a "Greenspeak" page with dozens of excerpts from Greenspan's past statements as head of the Federal Reserve Bank. Each quotation has a pointer to its  full context in his speech, and is posted without commentary or interpretation.

Other usage

In the 2010s, the Federal Reserve Open Market rate-setting committee (FOMC) began publishing dot plots to tabulate all individual committee member projections of target interest rates in a single graphic. In 2016, the president of the St. Louis Fed James Bullard began a movement away from the dot plot exercise, citing a gap of opinion between market economists and FOMC members.  , the FOMC has continued to publish dot plots in its economic projections, detailing the variety of opinions of the committee members for the "appropriate target range for the federal funds rate" in future years.

Commentary
The University of Virginia Writing Program Instructor Site offers some selected quotations from Greenspan, with a suggestion that students be given writing exercise assignments of clarifying their expression of ideas.

A public relations firm cites an example of "Greenspeak" as the statement of one of the "master practitioners of creative ambiguity over the years".  The brief essay mentions two other master practitioners of obfuscation, Hubert H. Humphrey and Casey Stengel.  The overall tone of the essay is one of awed admiration for a sometimes-necessary skill in obscurantism.  In closing, the writer notes that, "As professional performers say, to deliberately sing off-key requires a highly skilled singer."

See also
Index of public relations-related articles
Security through obscurity
Technobabble

References

Further reading

External links
 Fedspeak, Remarks by Governor Ben S. Bernanke

Monetary policy of the United States
Business terms
Corporate jargon
Federal Reserve System
Political terminology
Euphemisms
Forms of English